Matías Rossi (born 2 April 1984) is an Argentine racecar driver. He competes full-time in the Turismo Carretera, driving the No. 317 Toyota Camry for Toyota Gazoo Racing and in the Stock Car Pro Series, driving the No. 117 Toyota Corolla for A. Mattheis Vogel Motorsport.

He is the youngest person to win back-to-back TC2000 championships, in 2006–2007. In 2010 he won the Konex Award.

He began his career by driving go-karts at the age of 11.  He raced outside his homeland in American Formula One Championships and World Formula One Championships. Returning to Argentina, he started competing in Formula Renault and then in the Formula Super Renault series.

He joined the Turismo Carretera racing series in 2003. He obtained his first win in the Turismo Carretera at the Comodoro Rivadavia circuit in 2007. He would get two more victories later on that year to finish second overall for the season, behind Christian Ledesma.

In 2005, Rossi started racing in the TC2000 series as well, where he won the 2006 and 2007 championships at the wheel of Pro Racing's Chevrolet Astra. From 2008 to 2010 he raced in TC2000 for Renault, where he finished 5th, 5th and 7th. in 2011, Rossi joined Toyota Team Argentina and win his third TC 2000 championship that year. In 2012 he raced for Toyota in the Súper TC 2000 championship, finishing as the runner-up. He also competed in Turismo Carretera, finishing second, and in Top Race V6. In 2013 he won the championship in the Super TC 2000, in 2014 in the Turismo Nacional and in the Turismo Carretera and in 2019 in the Top Race V6. 

He was once again champion of the Súper TC 2000 in 2020. That year he also competed in Stock Car Brasil with Toyota and Full Time Sports.

Racing record

Career summary

Complete Stock Car Brasil results
(key) (Races in bold indicate pole position; results in italics indicate fastest lap)

External links
Official site 
Profile at HistoricRacing.com 

1984 births
Living people
Sportspeople from Buenos Aires Province
Argentine racing drivers
Formula Renault Argentina drivers
TC 2000 Championship drivers
Turismo Carretera drivers
Top Race V6 drivers
Stock Car Brasil drivers
Súper TC 2000 drivers

Toyota Gazoo Racing drivers